Michael Albert (born October 14, 1966) is an American pop artist, author and entrepreneur. He is the founder and owner of the Sir Real Fruit Juice Company.

Early life and education

Albert was born in Far Rockaway, NY and grew up in Woodmere, New York in Nassau County, Long Island. He is the second of three sons born to Larry and Wendy Albert. In 1991, he married Erynn Pindus and today they live in White Plains, New York and have four children.

Albert attended and graduated from P.S.#6 in Woodmere, Lawrence Junior High School and Lawrence High School in 1984. He attended New York University School of Business and Public Administration, and graduated with a B.S. in Business Administration in 1988. He majored in management with a minor in International Business. During this time he visited many museums in New York City and in Europe.

Career

Business
Upon graduation in May 1988, Albert co-founded a specialty foods distribution business with two schoolmates.  The three began distributing Wild Lingonberry Juice and other specialty groceries to specialty food retailers throughout the greater NY Metropolitan area. In 1991, he independently founded Tri-State Natural Food Products Inc.  In 1993, he combined his art skills with business knowledge and contacts and founded the Sir Real Fruit Juice Company, which in 2015 he continues to operate in White Plains, NY.

Pop Artist
Albert began creating art during the latter part of his college years at NYU. During the first seven years he drew extensively, mostly with wax oil sticks but also with pen and ink, colored pencils, markers, and crayons.

In 1994 he began creating collages from extra stickers he accumulated from junk mail and his home and business life.

In 1995, he began making collages from surplus and discarded photographs and in 1996 he created his first completed Pop Art work from a discarded Frosted Flakes cereal box (The Birth of Cerealism, 1996). Since then he has created more than 1,000 original collages by hand and has developed a recognizable style and exhibiting his work throughout the United States. Since 2000 he has been creating "Epic" scale collages that take months and years to create, each representing a theme, including historical, biblical, literary, mathematical, lyrical, botanical, and geographical.

Author

In 2008, Albert's first book was published by Henry Holt and Company called, An Artist's America. The 48-page picture book is an autobiography and introduction to his art with a section showing how to create collages in his style.

Teaching Artist

Albert has developed a program called the "Modern Pop Art Experience" and has been traveling around the US and Europe teaching at schools, libraries and museums about his particular form of Pop Art where he makes collages from discarded cardboard consumer packages. He has brought this program to hundreds of venues including: The Smithsonian Museum of American Art, The Eric Carle Museum of Picture Book Art Amherst, MA, New York Public Library, and Chicago Public Library among others.

References

1966 births
Living people
People from Far Rockaway, Queens
Writers from Queens, New York
Businesspeople from Queens, New York
Artists from New York City
People from Woodmere, New York
Lawrence High School (Cedarhurst, New York) alumni
New York University Stern School of Business alumni